"Interstate Love Song" is a single by American rock band Stone Temple Pilots. Released in September 1994, the song is from the band's second studio album, Purple. Considered one of the band's biggest hits, "Interstate Love Song" reached number one on the US Billboard Album Rock Tracks chart (current Mainstream Rock) on September 17, 1994, replacing the band's previous single "Vasoline". The song stayed at number one for 15 weeks, a record at the time, and gave the Stone Temple Pilots 17 consecutive weeks at number one with both songs. It also peaked at number two on the Billboard Modern Rock Tracks chart and in Iceland, as well as number 20 in Canada.

"Interstate Love Song" has been praised as one of the best songs of the 1990s and was featured on STP's greatest hits compilation Thank You in 2003. In 2009, it was named the 58th best hard rock song of all time by VH1. The song was ranked at number 17 on Australian alternative music station Triple J's Hottest 100 countdown of 1994 and Pitchfork ranked it at number 175 on its list of "The Top 200 Tracks of the 1990s."

Background, recording and release
Bassist Robert DeLeo brought in a song he had been working on when Stone Temple Pilots convened at Cole Rehearsal Studios in Hollywood, California in March 1992. His brother, guitarist Dean DeLeo, said, "We were in Atlanta touring Core, and Robert was playing around with the chords and the melody in a hotel room. I had a feeling about that song immediately." Robert DeLeo stated it was originally a bossa nova song when he began writing it. When he played it for singer Scott Weiland, the vocalist started humming along and turned what was originally the melody for the song's intro into a chorus melody. The song borrows chords directly from Jim Croce's 1973 song "I Got a Name."

Stone Temple Pilots recorded the song during sessions for Purple at the Southern Tracks studio in Atlanta, Georgia. Weiland was able to complete his vocals for the song in one take.

Upon its release as a single, "Interstate Love Song" reached number 18 on the Billboard Hot 100 Airplay and number one on the Mainstream Rock Tracks chart, where it stayed for fifteen weeks. The song also reached number two on the Modern Rock Tracks chart and number 22 on the Top 40 Mainstream.

In 2015, Loudwire and Stereogum ranked the song number one and number two, respectively, on their lists of the 10 greatest Stone Temple Pilots songs.

Composition
According to Weiland, the song was about the troubles he was having with his girlfriend, Jannina, saying, "The words are about the lies I was trying to conceal while making the Purple record". "She'd ask how I was doing, and I'd lie, say I was doing fine," he wrote in his autobiography Not Dead and Not For Sale. "I imagined what was going through her mind when I wrote, 'Waiting on a Sunday afternoon for what I read between the lines, your lies, feelin' like a hand in rusted shame, so do you laugh or does it cry? Reply?'"

The song has been described as grunge, alternative rock, country rock, and hard rock.

Music video
The music video, directed by Kevin Kerslake, has a washed-out color effect throughout the majority of the video and features a long-nosed protagonist escaping from an unseen pursuer. The protagonist's nose grows longer throughout the video (similar to Pinocchio), to symbolize the theme of lying in the song lyrics. At the beginning of the video, an early 1900s silent film-esque clip of the protagonist is shown.

Track listing
"Interstate Love Song" – 03:16
"Lounge Fly" – 05:19
"Vasoline" [Live] – 03:16
"Interstate Love Song" [Live] – 03:20

Charts

Weekly charts

Year-end charts

References

1994 singles
1994 songs
Atlantic Records singles
Music videos directed by Kevin Kerslake
Song recordings produced by Brendan O'Brien (record producer)
Songs about heroin
Songs written by Robert DeLeo
Songs written by Scott Weiland
Stone Temple Pilots songs